Neal Thompson is an American nonfiction writer who resides in Seattle, Washington with his family.  He has authored four full-length books, Driving With The Devil, Light This Candle, Hurricane Season and A Curious Man.

Books 
 Light This Candle: The Life and Times of Alan Shepard (2005), 
 Driving with the Devil: Southern Moonshine, Detroit Wheels, and the Birth of NASCAR (2007), 
 Hurricane Season: Hurricane Season: A Coach, His Team, and Their Triumph in the Time of Katrina (2007), 
 A Curious Man: The Strange and Brilliant Life of Robert "Believe It or Not!" Ripley  (2013), 
 Kickflip Boys: A Memoir of Freedom, Rebellion, and the Chaos of Fatherhood (2018)

References

External links 
 Official Website
 Book Review of Hurricane Season by Letters On Pages
 

1965 births
American non-fiction writers
Living people
University of Scranton alumni